The Lindsey Stirling 2012/2013 Tour is a worldwide concert tour by violinist Lindsey Stirling in support of her first studio album Lindsey Stirling. The tour started in September 22, 2012, and ended on August 28, 2013. Stirling's first tour lasted almost a year with 128 dates around North America, Europe, Asia, and Australia. The Lindsey Stirling Tour began three days before the CD release of her first album, Lindsey Stirling. Her tour began with dates around the United States and Canada in 2012. At the beginning of 2013, Stirling continued her tour in Europe as a "test tour". Her official European leg kicked off in Russia on May 22, 2013. In August, she continued her tour adding dates around Asia and Australia.

Setlist
The following set list is representative of the show on September 28, 2012. It is not representative of all concerts for the duration of the tour.
 "Moon Trance"
 "Spontaneous Me"
 "Shadows"
 "Electric Daisy Violin"
 "Skyrim"
 "River Flows in You"
 "We Found Love"
 "Lord of the Rings medley"
 "Michael Jackson medley"
 "Zi-Zi's Journey"
 "Crystallize"
 "Transcendence"
Encore
 "Phantom of the Opera"

Reception
The shows were a success in that 46 dates were sold out, and on Ticketmaster.com the audience gave a rating to the tour of 4.8 out of 5 stars.

Tour dates

Personnel
Band
 Lindsey Stirling – violin
 Jason Gaviati – keyboards, samples
 Drew Steen – drums, percussion

References

External links
Official website

2012 concert tours
2013 concert tours
Lindsey Stirling concert tours